ACPI (Advanced Configuration and Power Interface) is a computer firmware standard

ACPI may also refer to: 
 Advanced Configuration and Power Interface, for computer configuration and management 
 Animation Council of the Philippines, Inc.
 Association of Christian Philosophers of India
 America's Cup Properties Inc, in International C-Class Catamaran Championship